State Highway Loop 98 (Loop 98) is a state highway loop in Kerrville, Texas, in the Texas Hill Country. It runs  from Farm to Market Road 1338 (FM 1338) to State Highway 16 (SH 16). Loop 98 was established in 2010 as a redesignation of Spur 98.

Route description
Loop 98 begins at an intersection with FM 1338 on the west side of Kerrville. The route travels southwest to an intersection with SH 27 (Junction Highway), followed by a bridge over the Guadalupe River. Shortly after the Guadalupe, the road turns southeast along Thompson Drive. The route eventually turns east, reaching an intersection with FM 394 (Francisco Lemos Street) near Peterson Regional Medical Center. The route then passes First United Methodist Church and Louise Hays Park, before turning southeast and reaching its eastern terminus at SH 16 (Sidney Baker Street) near River Hills Mall.

History
Loop 98 was designated on May 9, 1940, as Spur 98, a replacement for SH 248. On March 27, 1978, Spur 98 was extended northwest . Spur 98 was extended west and north  and redesignated as Loop 98 on April 29, 2010.

Major intersections

References

098
Transportation in Kerr County, Texas
Kerrville, Texas